Saldus Art School is an art school in Saldus, Latvia founded in 1984. Approximately 130 students from the age of eight to sixteen attend the school after their lessons in contemporary school three times a week.

Learning process
Saldus Art school is an educational establishment. The seven-year curriculum consists of drawing, painting, sculpture, introduction to the language of art, composition and work with material. Students take part in nature studies - green practice in June every summer. They make their graduation pieces in the last semester of the 7th school year - wall paintings, ceramics, mosaics, paintings on silk, graphics and other artworks in public places.

Staff personnel
Ten teachers work in Saldus Art school: professional painters, artists in ceramics, designers and an architect. The headmistress is Vēsma Krūmiņa, teachers are Zigrīda Buzoverova, Gunta Kraulere, Merike Armulika, Kristīne Ozola, Ilze Zemīte, Linda Buzoverova, Anna Dobele, and Silvija Nārvila.

Projects
Teachers at the school offer courses and master classes for adults and children, during the school year and in summer. 
The school, in cooperation with the Council of Saldus, organizes an open air workshop during the summer months. Participants in the camp include children not only from Latvia, but also from Saldus's "twin" towns of Paide, Estonia; Mažeikiai, Lithuania; and Sergiyev Posad, Russia.

References

Saldus
Schools in Latvia
Educational institutions established in 1984
Art schools in Latvia
Visual arts education
1984 establishments in the Soviet Union
Schools in the Soviet Union